Marina von Neumann Whitman (born March 6, 1935) is an American economist, writer and former automobile executive. She is a professor of business administration and public policy at the University of Michigan's Ross School of Business as well as The Gerald R. Ford School of Public Policy.

From 1979 until 1992 she was an officer of the General Motors Corporation, first as vice president and chief economist, and later as vice president and group executive for public affairs, which included the Economics, Environmental Activities, Industry-Government Relations and Public Relations staffs. She also serves or has served as a director of several leading multinational corporations and research and policy institutions, including the Institute for Advanced Study and Peterson Institute for International Economics.

Prior to her appointment at GM, Whitman was a member of the faculty in the Department of Economics at the University of Pittsburgh, beginning as an instructor in 1962 and becoming Distinguished Public Service Professor of Economics in 1973. She served as a member of the President's Council of Economic Advisers in 1972–73, while on leave from the university.  She was a director at the Council on Foreign Relations between 1977 and 1987. She is also a former member of the Steering Committee of the Bilderberg Group.

Whitman received a B.A. in government from Radcliffe College (now Harvard University), graduating at the top of her class, and her M.A. and Ph.D. degrees in economics from Columbia University. The author of many books, monographs and articles, she is the recipient of numerous fellowships, honors and awards, and holds honorary degrees from over twenty colleges and universities.

Personal life

Her father was the mathematician and polymath John von Neumann, one of the foremost mathematicians and scholars of the 20th century. She is married to Robert Freeman Whitman, professor emeritus of English at the University of Pittsburgh, and has two children and two grandchildren. Her step-brother is George H. Kuper, former president and chief executive officer of the Council of Great Lake Industries and an independent consultant in the areas of public policy, environmental and energy issues. Her son, Malcolm Whitman, is professor of developmental biology at Harvard University. Her daughter, Laura Whitman, is a specialist in internal medicine and out-patient medical education at Yale University. Laura is married to David L. Downie, a scholar of international environmental policy, who is the son of Leonard Downie, Jr., the journalist and long-time editor of the Washington Post.

Education
Ph.D. Columbia University, 1962 – economics
M.A. Columbia University, 1959 – economics
B.A. Radcliffe College, 1956 (summa cum laude) – government

Honorary degrees
Doctor of Humane Letters, Eastern Michigan University, 1992
Doctor of Laws, University of Notre Dame, 1984
Doctor of Laws, Claremont University Center & Graduate School, 1984
Doctor of Laws, Denison University, 1983
Doctor of Laws, Lehigh University, 1981
Doctor of Laws, Mount Holyoke College, 1980
Doctor of Letters, Williams College, 1980
Doctor of Humane Letters, Baruch College, 1980
Doctor of Laws, Ripon College, 1980
Doctor of Laws, Amherst College, 1978
Doctor of Laws, Rockford College, 1978
Doctor of Laws, Allegheny College, 1977
Doctor of Laws, Wilson College, 1977
Doctor of Laws, Rollins College, 1976
Doctor of Laws, Marietta College, 1976
Doctor of Laws, New York Polytechnic Institute, 1975
Doctor of Laws, Coe College, 1975
Doctor of Humane Letters, University of Massachusetts, 1975
Doctor of Laws, Hobart and William Smith Colleges, 1973
Doctor of Laws, Cedar Crest College, 1973
Doctor of Humane Letters, Russell Sage College, 1972

Professional positions
Professor of Business Administration and Public Policy, University of Michigan, 1994–
Distinguished Visiting Professor of Business Administration and Public Policy, University of Michigan, 1992–1994
Vice President and Group Executive, Public Affairs & Marketing Staffs, General Motors Corporation, August 1990 – 1992
Vice President and Group Executive, Public Affairs Staffs, General Motors Corporation, April 1985 – August 1990
Vice President and Chief Economist, General Motors Corporation, August 1979 – April 1985
Fellow, Center for Advanced Study in the Behavioral Sciences, Stanford, California, 1978–1979 (on sabbatical leave from University of Pittsburgh)
Distinguished Public Service Professor of Economics, University of Pittsburgh, September 1973 – 1979
Member, Council of Economic Advisers, Executive Office of the President, March 1972 – August 1973
Member, National Price Commission, October 1971 – February 1972
Professor of Economics, University of Pittsburgh, 1971–1973 (on leave March 1972 – August 1973)
Senior Staff Economist, Council of Economic Advisers, 1970–1971 (on leave from University of Pittsburgh)
Associate Professor of Economics, University of Pittsburgh, 1966–1971
Assistant Professor of Economics, University of Pittsburgh, 1964 – spring 1966
Lecturer in Economics, University of Pittsburgh, 1962–1964
Staff Economist, Economic Study of the Pittsburgh Region (Pittsburgh Regional Planning Association and Center for Regional Economic Studies), 1962

Corporate directorships
Unocal Corporation, 1993–2005 (retired)
Procter & Gamble Company, 1976–2003 (retired)
J.P. Morgan Chase Corporation 2001–2002 (retired)
Alcoa, 1994–2002 (retired)
Chase Manhattan Corporation 1996–2000 (merged into J.P. Morgan Chase Corporation)
Browning-Ferris Industries, 1992–1999 (company sold to Allied Waste Corporation)
Chemical Banking Corporation 1992–1996 (merged into Chase Manhattan Corporation)
Manufacturers Hanover Trust Corporation and Manufacturers Hanover Trust Company, 1973–1991 (merged into Chemical Banking Corporation)
Westinghouse Electric Corporation, 1973–1979 (resigned upon taking position at GM due to potential conflict of interest)
Marcor Corporation, 1974–1976 (merged into Mobil Corporation)

Academic and research boards
Board of Trustees, Institute for Advanced Study
Board of Trustees, National Bureau of Economic Research
Board of Directors, Institute for International Economics
Board of Trustees, Salzburg Seminar
Advisory Board Member, Leadership Council, Center for the Education of Women, University of Michigan
Board of Governors, Rackham Graduate School, University of Michigan, 1992–1999
Member, Overseers' Committee to Visit Kennedy School of Government, Harvard University, 1992–1998
Board of Directors, Eurasia Foundation, 1992–1995
Board of Trustees, Princeton University, 1980–1990;
Board of Directors, The Atlantic Council, 1975–1983
Board of Directors, American Finance Association, 1979–1981
Board of Directors, The Council on Foreign Relations, 1977–1987
Board of Overseers, Harvard University, 1972–1978

Government activities
Member, Technology Assessment Advisory Council of the U.S. Congress Office of Technology Assessment, 1990–1995
 President's Advisory Committee on Trade Policy and Negotiations, 1987–1993
President's Export Council, 1986–87
Commission on Security and Economic Assistance, 1983–1984 President's Commission on Executive Exchange, 1981–1984
President's Commission for a National Agenda for the Eighties, 1979–1980
Economic Advisory Committee, U.S. Department of Commerce, 1979–1980
Advisory Committee on the International Monetary System to the U.S. Treasury Department, 1977–1985
Academic Consultants meetings, Federal Reserve Board, February 1977
Advisory Committee on Technology and World Trade, 1976–1978 (Office of Technology Assessment)
Seminars on Global Trade Objectives in an Interdependent World, for U.S. Information Agency – India, February 17–29, 1976
Advisory Committee on the Balance of Payments Statistics Presentation, 1975–1976 (Office of Management and Budget)
The President's Advisory Group on Contributions of Technology to Economic Strength, 1975–1976
The President's Economic Summit Meetings, 1974
Quarterly Economic Meetings, Council of Economic Advisers, 1973–1975
Member, Council of Economic Advisers, Executive Office of the President, March 1972 – August 1973
Member, National Price Commission, October 1971 – February 1972
Staff Economist, Economic Study of the Pittsburgh Region (Pittsburgh Regional Planning Association and Center for Regional Economic Studies), 1962

Selected publications

Books
The Martian's Daughter. A Memoir, The University of Michigan Press, 2012.
 New World, New Rules: The Changing Role of the American Corporation, Harvard Business School Press, 1999
 Reflections of Interdependence: Issues for Economic Theory and U.S. Policy, University of Pittsburgh Press, 1979.
 Government Risk-Sharing in Foreign Investment, Princeton University Press, 1965

Monographs
The Responsibility Paradox: Multinational Firms and Global Corporate Social Responsibility, with Gerald David and Mayer Zaid, Ross School of Business Working Paper Series, Working Paper 1031, April 2006 
Do Exchange Rates Matter: A Global Survey (Project Chair; major authors: Gail Fosler and Eliza Winger), The Conference Board, New York, 2004
American Capitalism and Global Convergence, Group of Thirty, Washington, D.C., 2003
The Evolving Corporation: Global Imperatives and National Responses (editor), Group of Thirty, Washington., D.C., 2000
International Trade and Investment:  Two Perspectives:  Essays in International Finance #143, Princeton University Press, July 1981
 Economic Goals and Policy Instruments: Policies for Internal and External Balance, Princeton, Special Papers in International Economics #9, 1970

Scholarly and policy articles
Gerald F. Davis, Marina von Neumann Whitman and Mayer N. Zald, "Political Agency and the Responsibility Paradox: Multinationals and Corporate Social Responsibility" In Contemporary Political Agency, Bice Maiguashca and Raffaele Marchetti, eds., London: Routledge, 2013.
Gerald F. Davis, Marina V.N. Whitman, and Mayer N. Zald, 2008.  "The responsibility paradox." Stanford Social Innovation Review 6(1): 30-37 (2008).
"The Open Economy Macromodel: Interactions Between Theoretical Developments and Real-World Behavior," in Arie Arnon and Warren Young (eds.), The Open Economy Macromodel: Past, Present and Future, Boston, Dordrecht and London, Kluwer Academic Publishers, 2002.
"Global Competition and the Changing Role of the American Corporation," The Washington Quarterly, March 1999.
"Domestic Policy Requirements for a Liberal Trade Regime," in Géza Feketekuty (ed.), Trade Strategies for a New Era: Ensuring U.S. Leadership in a Global Economy, New York: Council on Foreign Relations Press, 1998
"Trade and Growth: Restoring the Virtuous Circle" in Jerry Jasinowski (ed.), The Rising Tide: A Path Towards Higher Growth and Economic Prosperity, Wiley & Sons, Inc., 1998
"Labor Market Adjustment and Trade:  Their Interaction in the Triad," in Benjamin Cohen (ed.), International Trade and Finance: New Frontiers for Research, Cambridge University Press, 1997.
"The Socially Responsible Corporation:  Responsible to Whom and for What?" in John W. Houck and Oliver F. Williams (eds.), Is the Good Corporation Dead?  Social Responsibility in a Global Economy, Lanham, MD: Rowman & Littlefield, 1996
"Using Board Guidelines as a Strategic Tool," The Corporate Board, September/October 1995 *"Flexible Markets, Flexible Firms," The American Enterprise, Vol. 5, No. 3, May–June 1994, pp. 26–37
"The State of Business:  Global Competitiveness and Economic Nationalism," Harvard International Review, Vol.XV, No. 4, Summer 1993
"Assessing Greater Variability of Exchange Rates:  A Private Sector Perspective," in American Economic Review, Vol. 74, No. 2, May 1984
"Persistent Unemployment:  Economic Policy Perspectives," in Unemployment & Growth in the Western Economies, Vol. 2, Project on European Relations, Council on Foreign Relations, 1984
"Global Monetarism and the Monetary Approach to the Balance of Payments," Brookings Papers on Economic Activity, 3:1975
"The Payments Adjustment Process and the Exchange-Rate Regime:  What Have We Learned?" in American Economic Review, Papers and Proceedings, May 1975
"The Current and Future Role of the Dollar:  How Much Symmetry?" Brookings Papers on Economic Activity, 3:1974
(with N.C. Miller) "Alternative Theories and Tests of U.S. Short-Term Foreign Investment," Journal of Finance, December 1973
(with N.C. Miller) "A Mean-Variance Analysis of the United States Long-Term Portfolio Foreign Investment," Quarterly Journal of Economics, Vol. 84 (May 1970)

Fellowships and awards
New York Association of Business Economists, William F. Butler Memorial Award, 1988
Columbia University, Award for Excellence, 1984
Women's Equity Action League Achievement Award, 1979
Jane Addams Medal, Rockford College, 1976
Catalyst Award honoring outstanding women in the corporate world, 1976
George Washington Award of the American Hungarian Foundation, 1975
Columbia University Medal for Excellence, 1973
Social Science Research Council Faculty Research Fellowship awarded for 1970–71 (postponed in order to accept Council of Economic Advisers appointment)
National Science Foundation research grant (held jointly with Professor N. C. Miller of Carnegie-Mellon University) for research on "Long-Term Portfolio Investment in the U.S. Balance of Payments," 1968–70
Research Grant from International Dimensions Program of the Academic Disciplines at the University of Pittsburgh, 1965–66 and 1966–67
NSF Cooperative Graduate Fellowship (awarded but not accepted)
AAUW American Fellowship (1961–62)
Earhart Foundation Dissertation Fellowship Friedman Fellowship (Columbia)
Jonathan Fay Prize (Radcliffe)
Phi Beta Kappa Prize for highest ranking senior (Radcliffe)

Memberships
American Academy of Arts and Sciences
American Economic Association
Council on Foreign Relations
National Association for Business Economists
Phi Beta Kappa Society

Professionally related activities
Board of Trustees, Institute for Advanced Study
Board of Trustees, National Bureau of Economic Research
Member, Bretton Woods Committee, Study of International Institutions
Board of Directors, Institute for International Economics
Member, Consultative Group on International Economic and Monetary Affairs (Group of Thirty)
Member, Council on Foreign Relations
Advisory Committee, Bioterrorism Response Group, University of Michigan
Advisory Board, Institute for Social Research, University of Michigan
Board of Trustees, Salzburg Seminar
Member, Advisory Council, Center for Economic Policy Studies, Princeton University
Member, Advisory Board, Council of Great Lakes Industries
Member, Group of Thirty
Steering Committee, International Institute and Advanced Studies Center, University of Michigan, 2002–2004
Board of Governors, Rackham Graduate School, University of Michigan, 1992–1999
Member, Overseers' Committee to Visit Kennedy School of Government, Harvard University, 1992–1998
Member, The Detroit News Michigan Board of Contributors, 1993–1998
Member, Commission on NAFTA and Beyond, Center for Strategic and International Studies and Carter Center (sponsors), 1993–1995
Member, The Trilateral Commission, 1973–1984; 1988–1995
Board of Directors, Eurasia Foundation, 1992–1995
Member, Commission on Presidential Debates, 1987–1988
Member, Planning Committee on International Issues, Harvard University, 1990–1994
Member, Advisory Board, Issues in Science & Technology published by the National Academy of Sciences, 1984–1990
Board of Trustees, Princeton University, 1980–1990 [Chairman, Finance Committee (1982–1986); Chairman, Curriculum Committee (1986–1990); Advisory Council, *Department of Economics (1973–1980), Chairman (1976–1977)]
Senior Adviser, Brookings Panel on Economic Activity, 1976–1987
Board of Directors, Atlantic Council, 1975–1983
Board of Directors, American Finance Association, 1979–1981
Board of Directors, The Council on Foreign Relations, 1977–1987
Executive Committee, American Economic Association, 1977–1980
Adjunct Scholar and Member, Academic Advisory Board, American Enterprise Institute, 1976–1979  *National Planning Association, Committee on the Changing International Realities and Their Implications for U. S. Policy, 1975–1981
Editorial Board, Foreign Policy, 1974–1979
Board of Overseers, Harvard University, 1972–1978
Member, Brookings Panel on Economic Activity, 1974–1975
Board of Editors, American Economic Review, 1974–1977
Commission on Critical Choices for Americans, 1974–1976
Selection Committee, Rockefeller Public Service Awards, 1976–1980
Member, Advisory Council, Department of Economics, Princeton University, 1973–1980, Chairman, 1976–1977
Chair, Committee to Visit Department of Economics, 1975–78 *Chair, Committee to Visit Department of Statistics, 1972–75
Moderator of TV Series on 200+ PBS Stations: Economically Speaking, 1978 and 1979

References

Sources
Marina Whitman, Professor of Public Policy, Gerald R. Ford School of Public Policy & Professor of Business Administration, Stephen M. Ross School of Business Administration 
Marina Whitman, Professor of Business Administration and Public Policy
University of Michigan Press, The memoir of Marina von Neumann Whitman
Discussion at Columbia University - Book Launch: "The Martian's Daughter: A Memoir" by Marina von Whitman
Book Review: "Trailblazer's memoir reads like work of fiction"
Nixon Presidential Library and Museum, Marina Whitman
Weddings: Laura Whitman and David Downie, New York Times, 7 June 1992
Appointment of Marina von Neumann Whitman as a Member of the Advisory Committee for Trade Negotiations
Online Archives of California: Marina von Neumann Whitman Papers, White House Central Files, 1971–1973
Life with Father

External links
Marina v.N. Whitman at the Gerald R. Ford School of Public Policy
Marina Whitman at the Ross School of Business, University of Michigan
Marina Whitman, Economist & Professor
A Few Good Women... Marina Whitman
Book signing: "The Martian's Daughter", Marina von Neumann Whitman, author

1935 births
Living people
American economists
American economics writers
American manufacturing businesspeople
American people of Hungarian-Jewish descent
American women business executives
American business executives
Columbia Graduate School of Arts and Sciences alumni
Jewish American writers
Jewish women writers
General Motors former executives
Group of Thirty
Members of the Steering Committee of the Bilderberg Group
Nixon administration personnel
Procter & Gamble people
Radcliffe College alumni
Ross School of Business faculty
Gerald R. Ford School of Public Policy faculty
Trustees of the Institute for Advanced Study
United States Council of Economic Advisers
University of Pittsburgh faculty
American women economists
Writers from New York (state)
American women non-fiction writers
Marina